Svante Henryson (born 22 October 1963 in Stockholm, Sweden) is a composer, cellist, bass guitarist and double bassist, active within jazz, classical music, and hard rock.

Biography

Childhood and studies
Svante Henryson grew up in Umeå in northern Sweden. His father was a Full Professor of Education, and his mother a Director of Studies in English at Umeå University.

At age 12, after falling in love-at-a-distance with a female bassist at a concert, Svante began playing bass guitar in a rock band. Two years later, he switched to jazz and double bass. A concert with Stan Getz at the Umeå Jazz Festival made up his mind about becoming a musician.
Another life-changing experience was hearing the Royal Stockholm Philharmonic Orchestra in concert in Östersund.

He left his hometown already at age 14 to study music; two years in Härnösand, three years at Ingesund College of Music and (later) one year at the Academy of Performing Arts in Prague.
He was Principal Double Bass of the World Youth Orchestra 1983 to 1984.

Early professional years
Still in his teens and halfway through music college, he became a member of the Oslo Philharmonic under Mariss Jansons 1983–1986.
After making his solo debut with the Oslo Philharmonic in Wanhal's Bass Concerto, he became the orchestra's Assistant Principal Bassist.

1987–1989 he was Principal Bassist of the Norwegian Chamber Orchestra led by Iona Brown.

After a drastic change in direction,
he became bass guitarist of Yngwie Malmsteen's band 1989–1992.
During this period he started playing cello, an instrument on which he is an autodidact.

Henrysons first solo album, Enkidu, was released in 1997.
He has also been prominently featured on many other albums in a very wide musical area.

As a session player he has worked with Ryan Adams, Elvis Costello and Steve Gadd.

Today
Svante Henryson is a composer of orchestral music, as well as choral music and chamber music.
His "Electric Bass Concerto", composed in 2007, introduces the bass guitar in a new role as a classical solo instrument.

Elvis Costello and Henryson collaborated as songwriters on the album "For the Stars".

Svante Henryson is an ECM recording artist, performing in various formations with Jon Balke, Ketil Bjørnstad, Wolfgang Muthspiel, Marilyn Mazur, Arve Henriksen, Trygve Seim, Anders Jormin, Terje Rypdal and Palle Mikkelborg.

He also performs in chamber music duos and trios with Roland Pöntinen, Martin Fröst, Anne Sofie von Otter and Bengt Forsberg.
Svante has been the Musical Director of Asian, American and European tours with Anne Sofie von Otter.

Svante Henryson was Northern Norway's Landsdelsmusikernes Artist-in-Residence 2010–2012, composing and performing with the Sami community.

He is currently artistic director of the Umeå Chamber Music Festival.

Svante Henryson is a member of the Royal Swedish Academy of Music.

Awards
The Royal Swedish Academy of Music International Studies Scholarship 1983

Spellemannprisen 1984 for Tchaikovsky Symphony No. 5 (with the Oslo Philharmonic)
Spellemannprisen 1987 for Shostakovich Symphony No. 5 (with the Oslo Philharmonic)
Spellemannprisen 1988 for Britten/Mozart/Tchaikovsky (with the Norwegian Chamber Orchestra)
Spellemannprisen 1988 Spellemann of the Year (with the Norwegian Chamber Orchestra)

Rikskonserter Sweden, the Lansering '90 Prize in 1990.

The 1997 Nordkraft Prize for jazz soloists.

Chamber Music Piece of the Year in 2010 for Sonata for Solo Violin awarded by the Swedish Music Publishers' Association.

Jazz Musician of the Year ("Jazzkatten") by the Swedish Radio in 2014.

Henryson was awarded the Nordic Council Music Prize in 2015.

Works
(selected)

Orchestral
Symphony no.1 for orchestra (1993)
Legatissimo for cello and orchestra (first performance 1996)
Songs from the Milky Way concerto for cello and orchestra (1997)
Memento for cello and string orchestra (2003)
Electric Bass Concerto no. 1 for bass guitar and orchestra (2007)
Vinterfest concert overture for orchestra (2007)
Symphony no.2 - Sinfonia Concertante for orchestra (2009)
Cello Concerto nr. 2 for cello and orchestra (2010)
Amorphicon for steel pans, electric cello and string orchestra (2011)
Electric Bass Concerto no. 2 "Ghostnotes" for fretless bass guitar and symphonic wind ensemble (2015)
I dreamt of a Bach Cello Concerto for cello, strings and basso continuo (2019)
Five Timepieces for jazz cello and string orchestra (2019)
From Nowhere for orchestra (2020)

Choral
Eyes of a Child for five voices a cappella (1999)
Himlar av Djupaste Glädje for soprano, mixed choir and piano (2007)
Enfaldiga Ren for soprano, mezzo, alto, mixed choir, string octet, guitar and six-handed piano (2009)
DoReMi SaReGa for cello, men's choir and jazz trio (2009)
Lämmeln och vråken for female choir, accordion and cello (2010)
Vidderna Inom Mig for cello, mixed choir, children's choir and chamber orchestra (2011)

Chamber music
Vintermusik for soprano, tenor, narrator, clarinet, bassoon, violin, double bass and percussion (1980)
Slussen (the Sluice) for cello and city sounds (1994)
Suite Off Pist for soprano saxophone and cello (1996, 2019)
Colors in D (Black Run-Green-Blues Chaconne) for solo cello (2001-1996-2008)
π (pi) for violin, cello and drum set (2006)
Sarabande Metamorphose for cello and piano (2007)
Allegro Moderato for clarinet, cello and piano (2007)
Quartet for Violin, Viola and Two Celli (2007)
Eckency for cello and piano (2008)
Sonata for Solo Violin (2009)
Narvik 9 for flute, clarinet, bassoon, string quartet, hammerclavier and bass guitar (2012)
3X3 for violin, cello and guitar (2012)
Rain for cello and piano (2013)
Fragments for violin and cello (2013)
Desperate Love Songs for mezzo, cello and guitar (2013)
Mon Lean Duhat Jagi - music for a Sami theatre play for flute, clarinet, string quartet, piano and percussion (2014)
Eurydice and Her Underground Dance Routines for soprano saxophone, violin, piano, electric bass and drum set (2014)
Mastodonic Recital for narrator, tenor saxophone, piano, electric bass and drum set (2015)
Mirrors of Absence 24 songs for mezzo and piano (2016)
First Movement for piano trio (2017)
String Quartet no. 1 (2018)
Two Pieces for cello and guitar (2019)
Rakesong for cello and piano (2019)
Light Touches for cello and double bass (2020)
Mattagit for yoik and four double basses (2021)
Crux for soprano saxophone (2021)
String Quartet no. 2 (2022)

Discography
(selected)

Norwegian Chamber Orchestra/Iona Brown – Mozart/Britten/Tchaikovsky (recorded in 1988) double bass
Norwegian Chamber Orchestra/Iona Brown – Mozart (1988) double bass
Yngwie Malmsteen – Eclipse (1990) bass guitar, double bass
Yngwie Malmsteen – Fire & Ice (1991) bass guitar, double bass, cello
Norwegian Chamber Orchestra/Iona Brown – Britten (1991) double bass, cello
Glory – Crisis vs crisis (1994) bass guitar, double bass, cello
Uno Svenningsson – Under ytan (1994) cello
Thomas Jäderlund – Amazing Orchestra (1994) cello, composer
Erik Weissglas – Stoneheater (1994) composer, bass guitar, double bass, cello
Ted Gärdestad – Äntligen på väg (1994) bass guitar
Kee Marcello – Shine on (1995) bass guitar, double bass
Lion's Share – Fall From Grace (2000) cello
Brazen Abbot – Live and learn (1995) bass guitar
Joey Tempest – A place to call home (1995) bass guitar
Mikael Samuelson – Midvinter (1996) composer, cello, celtar
Svante Henryson – Enkidu (1997) composer, cello, celtar, double bass
Anne Sofie von Otter – Home for Christmas (1999) arranger, cello, celtar, double bass
Anne Sofie von Otter/Elvis Costello – For the Stars (2000) composer, cello, double bass, bass guitar
Svante Henryson, Daniel Nelson, Fredrik Högberg – 21st Century Swedish Composers (2001) composer, cello
Jon Balke's Magnetic North Orchestra – Kyanos (2001) cello, composer
Ryan Adams – Demolition (2002) cello
Ketil Bjørnstad – Seafarer's Song (2003) cello
Morten Halle Trio – Ten Easy Pieces (2004) cello
Krister Jonsson Trio + Svante Henryson – Waiting For Atonesjka (2004) cello, composer
Musik för Trio – Music for Trio (2007) composer, double bass, cello
Kristin Asbjørnsen – The Night Shines Like the Day (2008) cello, bass guitar
Wihk/Henryson/Gadd – Same Tree Different Fruit (2009) bass guitar, double bass
Ketil Bjørnstad – Hvalenes sang (2009) cello
Mats Bergström – Electric Counterpoint (2010) bass guitar
Ketil Bjørnstad & Svante Henryson – Night Song (2011) cello, composer
Arve Henriksen - The Nature Of Connections (2012) cello, composer
Krister Jonsson Deluxe - Truckload (2013) cello
Terje Isungset - Meditations (2013) ice cello
Wolfgang Muthspiel – Vienna World (2013) cello
The Real Group – Three Decades of Vocal Music (2013) composer
Katarina & Svante Henryson - High, Low or In Between (2014) cello, composer
Hélène Collerette – Norigine - works for Solo Violin (2015) composer
Trygve Seim - Rumi Songs (2015) cello
Weissglas-Henryson-Backenroth-Ekberg - Seven Songs from the 70s (2018) cello
Svante Henryson – Frånvarons speglar/Mirrors of absence - 24 songs (2019) composer

References

External links

Official web page

1963 births
People from Umeå
Swedish bass guitarists
Jazz bass guitarists
Jazz fusion musicians
Swedish session musicians
Classical double-bassists
Swedish male classical composers
20th-century classical composers
21st-century classical composers
Swedish cellists
Jazz cellists
Chamber jazz cellists
Avant-garde cellists
ECM Records artists
Living people
Avant-garde jazz cellists
Musicians from Stockholm
Academy of Performing Arts in Prague alumni
20th-century bass guitarists
21st-century bass guitarists
Male bass guitarists
21st-century double-bassists
20th-century Swedish male musicians
20th-century Swedish musicians
21st-century Swedish male musicians
Male jazz musicians
Yngwie J. Malmsteen's Rising Force members
Brazen Abbot members
20th-century cellists
21st-century cellists